Bash Kardan (also Romanized as Bash Kārdān; also known as Bash Kārdān-e Sarūk) is a village in Rahdar Rural District, in the Central District of Rudan County, Hormozgan Province, Iran. At the 2006 census, its population was 88, in 24 families.

References 

Populated places in Rudan County